Henry Willey (10 July 1824–15 March 1907) was an American lichenologist. He was also the editor of the New Bedford, Massachusetts newspaper The Standard from 1856 until 1900.

Biography
Henry Willey was born in Geneseo, New York in 1824. Before becoming an editor with The Standard he was a school teacher in Mattapoisett. He started collecting lichens around New Bedford in 1856, with the encouragement of leading American lichenologist Edward Tuckerman. This work eventually resulted in the publication of An Enumeration of the Lichens Found in New Bedford, Massachusetts, and its Vicinity from 1862 to 1892. This work contained 500 species and subspecies, including 17 newly described species. He published 26 papers about lichens between 1867 and 1898, and a total of 26 new species.

Willey's collection of lichen specimens was in its day one of the largest private American collections, numbering about 10,000 specimens. It is now kept at the Smithsonian Institution.

Willey died in Weymouth, Massachusetts, in 1907.

Selected publications

References

1824 births
1907 deaths
American lichenologists
People from Geneseo, New York